Mecynippus ciliatus is a species of beetle in the family Cerambycidae. It was described by Charles Joseph Gahan in 1888, originally under the genus Monochamus. It is known from Laos and China.

References

Lamiini
Beetles described in 1888